Health & Place is a bimonthly peer-reviewed public health journal covering the relationship between geographic location and health. It was established in 1995 and is published by Elsevier. The editor-in-chief is Jamie Pearce (University of Edinburgh).

Abstracting and indexing 
The journal is abstracted and indexed in CINAHL, Current Contents/Social & Behavioral Sciences, MEDLINE/PubMed, Embase, GEOBASE, Social Sciences Citation Index, Sociological Abstracts, Excerpta Medica, PsycINFO, and Scopus. According to the Journal Citation Reports, the journal has a 2015 impact factor of 2.4.

References

External links

Geography journals
Public health journals
Publications established in 1995
Bimonthly journals
Elsevier academic journals
English-language journals